The California mule deer (Odocoileus hemionus californicus) is a subspecies of mule deer whose range covers much of the state of California.

Anatomy
One of the principal means of distinguishing the closely related black-tailed deer and white-tailed deer is the growth habit of the buck's antlers.  In the case of the Black Tail and California mule deer, the antlers fork in an upward growth, whereas the other species' antlers grow in a forward direction.

Distribution
This subspecies, O. h. californicus, is widespread throughout northern and central California in the California coastal prairie, as well as inner coastal ranges and interior mountains, especially the Sierra Nevada.  This deer is much less frequently found on the floor of the interior valleys, and then mostly frequently in riparian zones.

Habitat
Generally, the California mule deer  has a preference for hill terrain, especially an oak woodland habitat.  It is a browser and  typically takes over 90% of its diet from shrubs and leaves and the balance from grasses.

Diet and behavior
California mule deer usually browse close to lakes or streams providing their water.  From that water source, they may roam 1-2 mi, and typically make their beds in grassy areas beneath trees within such a one-mile radius from both water and forage.

Repeatedly used beds often are scratched to a nearly level surface, about 2 m in diameter.  Less regularly used bedding areas are seen as flattened grass. On hot summer days, California mule deer often seek shade and rest in the midday.

In summer, California mule deer mainly browse on leaves of small trees, shrubs, and herbaceous plants, but also consume many types of berries (including blackberry, huckleberry, salal, and thimbleberry).  In winter, they may expand their forage to conifers (particularly twigs of Douglas fir), aspen, willow, dogwood, juniper, and sage.  Year-round, they  feed on acorns; grasses are a secondary food source.  Where humans have encroached on historic deer habitat by suburban development or orchards, California mule deer diversify their diet with garden plant material, tree fruit, and occasionally, pet food.

Fawns and does tend to forage together in familial groupings, while bucks tend to travel singly or with other bucks.  California mule deer browse most actively near dawn and dusk, but also forage at night in open agricultural areas or when experiencing hunting pressure.

Breeding
Rutting season occurs in autumn when the does come into estrus for a period lasting only several days.  Males exhibit aggressive behavior in competing for mates. Does  begin estrus again if they do not become pregnant. The gestation period is about 200 days, with fawns arriving in the spring; the young  remain with mothers throughout the summer and are weaned in the autumn. The buck's antlers fall off in the winter, and commence growing once more in spring in anticipation of next autumn's rut.

Human interactions
Since prehistoric times, the Native American indigenous peoples of California are known to have hunted California mule deer.  Thus, since about 12,000 BCE, Gage suggests that human populations have served as a control to the numbers of California mule deer.

In the modern era, since European colonists and Euro-Americans settled in California, hunting pressure intensified as the human population expanded and hunting became an activity not just associated with food supply.  In addition, human population growth (through urban development) in California has consumed large amounts of natural habitat of the California mule deer starting in the late 19th century and continuing through the present.

References

External links

U.S. Forest Service treatment — Odocoileus hemionus (Mule Deer) — including subspecies californicus

Deer
Mammals of the United States
Endemic fauna of California
Fauna of the Sierra Nevada (United States)
Fauna of the California chaparral and woodlands
Natural history of the California Coast Ranges
Natural history of the Santa Monica Mountains
Pre-Columbian California cuisine
Fauna without expected TNC conservation status